Epeoloides is a genus of kleptoparasitic bees which lay their eggs in the nests of melittid bees of the genus Macropis.

Consists of two species: 
Epeoloides coecutiens (Fabricius, 1775)
Epeoloides pilosulus (Cresson, 1878)

References 

Apinae
Bee genera